Pwllbach Colliery Co Ltd v Woodman [1915] AC 634 is an English land law case, concerning easements.

Facts
Pwllbach Colliery sublet land in Glamorganshire from a tinplate company, whose memorandum authorised mining to be carried on. A neighbouring butcher, Mr Woodman, had a later lease from the tinplate company too, but ‘subject to all rights and easements belonging to any adjoining and neighbouring property’. He built a slaughter house and a sausage factory. Then the colliery erected a screening apparatus which threw up coal dust. Mr Woodman brought an action for nuisance.

The jury found there was a nuisance but the screening was reasonable and usual for the district, without negligence.

Judgment
House of Lords held the memorandum allowing carrying on the trade of mining did not authorise the nuisance, unless it could be proven that the trade could not otherwise be continued. There was no easement for making coal dust.

Earl Loreburn said it was unnecessary to answer whether creating coal dust could be an easement because the company was never authorised to do a nuisance.

Lord Parker said that the coal dust emission could be classified as an easement, but there was no common intention on which such an easement could be based. The first class consisted of easements of necessity. As to the second, he said this:

See also

English land law
English trusts law
English property law

Notes

English land case law
1915 in case law
1915 in British law
Court of Appeal (England and Wales) cases